Dasineura brassicae, the brassica pod midge, is a rapeseed pest.

Gallery

References

Cecidomyiinae
Agricultural pest insects
Gall-inducing insects
Insects described in 1853